The Kreider-Reisner KR-21-A was a 1928 American two-seat monoplane. It was designed and built by the Kreider-Reisner Aircraft Company of Hagerstown, Maryland. Fairchild Aircraft took over Kreider-Reisner in 1929 and continued to build them, as the Fairchild KR-21, later the Fairchild 21.

Design and development
The KR-21-A was a low-wing braced monoplane with two open tandem cockpits and powered by a 100 hp (60 kW) Kinner K-5 radial piston engine. It was of mixed construction and had a fixed tailwheel landing gear and was fitted with dual controls.

The KR-21-B was a more powerful biplane development, using a 125 bhp Kinner B-5 engine. Five were produced, three built as -B models and two converted from the -A.

At least three, most of the production, survive today
 NC107M
 NC236V
 NC954V

The KR-21 would in turn form the basis of the KR-22 parasol-wing monoplane design.

Specifications (KR-21-A monoplane)

References

Notes

Bibliography

1920s United States civil utility aircraft
21
Biplanes
Single-engined tractor aircraft
Aircraft first flown in 1928